Samy El-Shall (Mohamed Samy El-Shall) is an Egyptian-American physical chemist and a researcher in nanoscience, heterogeneous catalysis, molecular clusters and cluster ions, nucleation and ion mobility. He is the Mary Eugenia Kapp Endowed Chair in Chemistry and Commonwealth Professor at Virginia Commonwealth University (VCU).

Early life and education
El-Shall was born in Cairo, Egypt, and spent his early life in Cairo. He is the grandson of Sheikh Mahmud Shaltut. He earned his B.S. degree in chemistry in 1976, and M.S. degree in physical chemistry in 1980 both from Cairo University. El-Shall earned his doctoral degree in physical chemistry from Georgetown University in 1985.

Career
El-Shall started his academic career in 1986 as a research associate at the University of California at Los Angeles (UCLA) while working with Howard Reiss on vapor phase nucleation and with Robert L. Whetten on molecular clusters and cluster ions. Since 1989, he has been on the faculty of the Chemistry Department, and has served as the Chair of the Chemistry Department at Virginia Commonwealth University (VCU) from 2015 to 2021. He is the Mary Eugenia Kapp Endowed Chair in Chemistry and Commonwealth Professor at Virginia Commonwealth University (VCU).

El-Shall served as a Senior Science Advisor in the Bureau for the Middle East, Middle East Regional Cooperation (MERC) Program of the USAID. He focused on enhancing and expanding joint Arab-Israeli research activities through MERC projects, and has also conducted site project reviews in Israel, Jordan and Egypt to improve collaborative research opportunities across borders and enhance implementation of research results. He also worked on creating new initiatives for young investigators in order to catalyze the next generation of Arab-Israeli research cooperation, and to create long-term sustainable collaborations between Arab and Israeli scientists.

Research
El-Shall's research interests include nanostructured materials, graphene and nanocatalysis for energy and environmental applications, gas phase clusters and vapor phase nucleation. El-Shall is the architect of the concept of cluster polymerization, and intracluster polymerization was first demonstrated in his lab at VCU.

As of 2021, El-Shall has written over 290 publications in refereed journals in the areas of physical chemistry, catalysis and nanoscience. He also holds 11 US patents on the synthesis of nanomaterials, nanoparticle catalysts, graphene, graphene-supported catalysts and graphene-based materials for the removal of pollutants from water.

Nucleation
El-Shall was the first to apply the Resonant Enhanced Multiphoton Ionization (REMPI) technique to selectively generate molecular ions within supersaturated host vapors and study the phenomena of ion-induced nucleation on well-defined ions. He also focused his study on the formation mechanisms of gold–zinc oxide hexagonal nanopyramids through heterogeneous nucleation using microwave synthesis. In 2018, he demonstrated nucleation and growth process of gold nanoparticles initiated by nanosecond and femtosecond laser irradiation of aqueous solutions of [AuCl4]−.

Nanoparticles
His group has also been involved in the development of a novel technique: Laser Vaporization Controlled Condensation (LVCC) for the synthesis of a variety of semiconductor, metal and metal oxide nanoparticles. His research lab is currently focused on the applications of graphene in heterogeneous catalysis and energy conversion, and he developed novel microwave and laser methods for the synthesis of nanoparticle catalysts supported on graphene. The recent discovery of efficient photo-thermal energy conversion by graphene-based materials by El-Shall's group has resulted in the development of new materials for efficient solar water desalination and the removal of heavy metals from contaminated water.

Awards and honors
1999 - Outstanding Faculty Award, State Council of Higher Education of Virginia (SCHEV)
2007 - Jabir Ibn Hyyan (Geber) Award, Saudi Chemical Society
2008 - SAE International Award for Research on Automotive Lubricants, Society of Automotive Engineering 
2012–13 - Jefferson Science Fellow (JSF), U.S. Department of State and USAID
2012 - Fellow, American Physical Society (APS)  "For pioneering contributions to the fields of ion-induced nucleation, ion mobility, thermochemistry and structures of molecular cluster ions, gas phase cluster polymerization, nanostructured materials and nanocatalysis"
2013 - Fellow, American Association for the Advancement of Science (AAAS) "For Distinguished contributions to the fields of clusters, nucleation, nanostructured materials and nanocatalysis, particularly for the novel synthesis of advanced nanomaterials"
2018 - Virginia Outstanding Scientist, Awarded by the Virginia Governor
2021 - Distinguished Service Award, Virginia Section of the American Chemical Society

Bibliography
Wang, W., Germanenko, I., & El-Shall, M. S. (2002). Room-temperature synthesis and characterization of nanocrystalline CdS, ZnS, and Cd x Zn1-x S. Chemistry of Materials, 14(7), 3028–3033.
Panda, A. B., Glaspell, G., & El-Shall, M. S. (2006). Microwave synthesis of highly aligned ultra narrow semiconductor rods and wires. Journal of the American Chemical Society, 128(9), 2790–2791.
Hassan, H. M., Abdelsayed, V., Abd El Rahman, S. K., AbouZeid, K. M., Terner, J., El-Shall, M. S., Al-Resayes, S. I. & El-Azhary, A. A. (2009). Microwave synthesis of graphene sheets supporting metal nanocrystals in aqueous and organic media. Journal of Materials Chemistry, 19(23), 3832–3837.
Abdelsayed, V., Moussa, S., Hassan, H. M., Aluri, H. S., Collinson, M. M., & El-Shall, M. S. (2010). Photothermal deoxygenation of graphite oxide with laser excitation in solution and graphene-aided increase in water temperature. The Journal of Physical Chemistry Letters, 1(19), 2804–2809.
Siamaki, A. R., Abd El Rahman, S. K., Abdelsayed, V., El-Shall, M. S., & Gupton, B. F. (2011). Microwave-assisted synthesis of palladium nanoparticles supported on graphene: A highly active and recyclable catalyst for carbon–carbon cross-coupling reactions. Journal of Catalysis, 279(1), 1–11.

References 

Living people
Year of birth missing (living people)
American people of Egyptian descent
Virginia Commonwealth University faculty
Cairo University alumni
Georgetown University Graduate School of Arts and Sciences alumni
Physical chemists
Fellows of the American Physical Society